The 1975–76 NBA season was the Detroit Pistons' 28th season in the NBA and 19th season in the city of Detroit.  The team played at Cobo Arena in downtown Detroit.  

The Pistons made a major move in the off-season, trading perennial All-Star Dave Bing to the Washington Bullets for NBA assist leader Kevin Porter.  Porter would only play 19 games for the Pistons in 1975-76, missing the bulk of the season with an injury.  Bing represented Washington at the 1976 NBA All-Star Game, honored as the game MVP.  The team also made a move at mid-season, firing coach Ray Scott.  Greg Eno from Out of Bounds described his January dismissal, "Thirty years ago and a month, Scott was conducting practice -- the Pistons were in a terrible slump at the time -- and management strode onto the court, relieved Ray Scott of his silver whistle, and marched him off the court to give him the Ziggy -- that Detroit word for a coach getting fired.  The Pistons hadn't yet learned to act with class in 1976. They were still a bush league franchise, even though Bing and Scott and Lanier had combined to put pro basketball on the map in Detroit. So the firing of Scott -- in front of his stunned players -- in January 1976 was done with all the subtlety of July 4th fireworks."  He was replaced by assistant Herb Brown.

The Pistons finished with a 36-46 (.439) record, 2nd place in the Midwest Division.  The team was led by forward Curtis Rowe (16.0 ppg, 8.7 apg, NBA All-Star) and center Bob Lanier (21.3 ppg, 11.7 rpg).  Detroit advanced to the 1976 NBA Playoffs, winning 10 of their 11 final games, and then won their first round series of the Western Conference playoffs 2-1 over the Milwaukee Bucks, the team's first playoff series win since the 1961-62 Detroit Pistons season.  Detroit won the deciding 3rd game of the series in Milwaukee 107-104, securing the win with a late Chris Ford steal.  The team then fell to the Golden State Warriors 4-2 in the Western Conference Semi-Finals, dropping the 6th game in overtime 118-116 at Cobo Arena in Detroit.

Draft picks

Roster

Regular season

Season standings

z – clinched division title
y – clinched division title
x – clinched playoff spot

Record vs. opponents

Playoffs

|- align="center" bgcolor="#ffcccc"
| 1
| April 13
| @ Milwaukee
| L 107–110
| Bob Lanier (25)
| Bob Lanier (15)
| Lanier, Clark (6)
| MECCA Arena8,912
| 0–1
|- align="center" bgcolor="#ccffcc"
| 2
| April 16
| Milwaukee
| W 126–123
| Bob Lanier (35)
| Curtis Rowe (10)
| Money, Clark (5)
| Cobo Arena8,330
| 1–1
|- align="center" bgcolor="#ccffcc"
| 3
| April 18
| @ Milwaukee
| W 107–104
| Bob Lanier (28)
| Bob Lanier (12)
| Eric Money (8)
| MECCA Arena8,213
| 2–1
|-

|- align="center" bgcolor="#ffcccc"
| 1
| April 20
| @ Golden State
| L 103–127
| Bob Lanier (18)
| Bob Lanier (16)
| Chris Ford (7)
| Oakland–Alameda County Coliseum Arena13,067
| 0–1
|- align="center" bgcolor="#ccffcc"
| 2
| April 22
| @ Golden State
| W 123–111
| Curtis Rowe (33)
| Curtis Rowe (10)
| Chris Ford (9)
| Oakland–Alameda County Coliseum Arena13,067
| 1–1
|- align="center" bgcolor="#ffcccc"
| 3
| April 24
| Golden State
| L 96–113
| Bob Lanier (23)
| Bob Lanier (16)
| Eric Money (8)
| Cobo Arena10,022
| 1–2
|- align="center" bgcolor="#ccffcc"
| 4
| April 26
| Golden State
| W 106–102
| Bob Lanier (30)
| Bob Lanier (11)
| Eric Money (7)
| Cobo Arena11,389
| 2–2
|- align="center" bgcolor="#ffcccc"
| 5
| April 28
| @ Golden State
| L 109–128
| Howard Porter (20)
| Bob Lanier (12)
| Archie Clark (5)
| Oakland–Alameda County Coliseum Arena13,067
| 2–3
|- align="center" bgcolor="#ffcccc"
| 6
| April 30
| Golden State
| L 116–118 (OT)
| Bob Lanier (30)
| Bob Lanier (16)
| Eric Money (9)
| Cobo Arena10,361
| 2–4
|-

References

Detroit Pistons seasons
Detroit
Detroit Pistons
Detroit Pistons